Angela Rosemary Tooby-Smith (née Tooby; born 24 October 1960) is a British former long-distance runner. She won a silver medal behind Ingrid Kristiansen at the 1988 IAAF World Cross Country Championships and a bronze medal in the 10,000 metres at the 1986 Commonwealth Games. She also finished ninth in the 10,000 metres final at the 1987 World Championships and competed at the 1988 Seoul Olympics. She is the twin sister of fellow athlete Susan Tooby.

Career
Born in Woolhope, Herefordshire, England, Tooby had her first successes in athletics in cross country running competitions. She competed at national level, winning the Welsh Cross-country Championships four times in 1984–1987 She ran at the IAAF World Cross Country Championships in 1984, finishing in 8th position overall, and improved the following year by taking sixth place at the 1985 race. She had also begun to make an impact on the track, recording the fourth fastest 5000 metres run of 1984.

She was the 10,000 metres bronze medallist at the 1986 Commonwealth Games, and finished ninth in the 10,000 metres race at the European Athletics Championships that year. She ran the second-fastest 5000 m run of 1987 (after Liz McColgan). In the 10,000 m race at the 1987 World Championships in Athletics, she finished ninth with a personal best of 31:55.30.

The 1988 season was Tooby's most successful: she became the UK Cross-country Champion and, following a win at the prestigious Almond Blossom Cross Country race, she won the silver medal at the 1988 IAAF World Cross Country Championships, behind Ingrid Kristiansen, and led the British women to a team silver medal as well. She attended her first Olympics soon after, but in the women's 10,000 metres at the 1988 Seoul Games, she was eliminated in the heats (following a stress fracture of the spine). Her compatriot Liz McColgan took the silver.

Tooby attended Aberystwyth University between 1979–1983 studying Geography and a PGCE in Geography & PE. She is married to Professor Andy Smith. Her twin sister Susan Tooby, also competed at the 1988 Olympics.

International competitions

References

External links
 
 British Olympic profile
 

1960 births
Living people
Sportspeople from Herefordshire
Welsh female long-distance runners
British female long-distance runners
Commonwealth Games bronze medallists for Wales
Commonwealth Games medallists in athletics
Athletes (track and field) at the 1986 Commonwealth Games
Athletes (track and field) at the 1990 Commonwealth Games
Olympic athletes of Great Britain
Athletes (track and field) at the 1988 Summer Olympics
World Athletics Championships athletes for Great Britain
Twin sportspeople
English twins
Medallists at the 1986 Commonwealth Games